Legislative elections were held in South West Africa on 16 November 1955. The whites-only election saw a victory for the National Party of South West Africa, which won 16 of the 18 seats in the Legislative Assembly.

Electoral system
The 18 members of the Legislative Assembly were elected from single-member constituencies: Aroab, Gobabis, Grootfontein, Keetmanshoop, Luderitz, Maltahöhe, Mariental, Okahandja, Otjikondo, Otjiwarongo, Outjo, Rehoboth, Swakopmund, Usakos, Warmbad, Windhoek East, Windhoek North and Windhoek West.

Results

References

Election
South-West Africa
Elections in Namibia
National Assembly (Namibia)
Election and referendum articles with incomplete results